Euchrysops alberta, the Sahel Cupid, is a butterfly in the family Lycaenidae. It is found in north-western Nigeria, Sudan and northern Uganda.

References

Butterflies described in 1901
Euchrysops